Saint-Denis Pleyel is a future Paris Métro station located in Saint-Denis, in the northern suburbs of Paris. Currently under construction as part of the Grand Paris Express project, the station is proposed to open in 2024 as the terminus of line 14. In future, the station will serve the orbital line 15 and be the terminus of lines 16 and 17.

Location 
Located in Saint-Denis, the station will be built west of the Paris-Lille railway lines, at the corner of Rue Pleyel and Francisque-Poulbot. The station Carrefour Pleyel of line 13 will be within walking distance of the station. A new bridge will be constructed to connect the station to Stade de France–Saint-Denis on RER D. The station is located close to the Stade de France, and will serve the stadium and other venues for the 2024 Olympic and Paralympic Games.

Design 
Built over 9 levels, the station will be able to accommodate 250,000 passengers a day - comparable to Châtelet–Les Halles. Its platforms will be located 27m below ground. The six tracks of lines 14, 15, 16 and 17 will be on the same level, with a cross-platform interchange between lines 14 and 15, and between line 15 and the shared track of lines 16/17.

The station will be designed by Japanese architect Kengo Kuma. An artwork will be installed in the station, designed by Belgian singer, songwriter and rapper Stromae and his younger brother.

Construction 
The construction of the shared trunk of lines 16 and 17, which includes this station, was declared to be of public utility on 28 December 2015. Construction of the station began in March 2017 with preparatory work. Civil engineering began in April 2018 with the construction of the underground walls of the station. The station is planned to open in 2024 in time for the Olympic and Paralympic Games, as part of an extension of Line 14 from Saint-Ouen.

References 

Paris Métro stations
2024 in rail transport
Transport in Paris
Paris Métro line 14
Paris Métro line 15
Paris Métro line 16
Paris Métro line 17